United States gubernatorial elections were held on 3 November 1953, in two states, New Jersey and Virginia.

Results

References

 
November 1953 events in the United States